The Gilchrist County Courthouse  is an historic two-story red brick courthouse building located at 112 South Main Street in Trenton, Gilchrist County, Florida. It was designed by the Jacksonville firm of Smith, Holborn, and Dozier and was built in 1933 by the Works Progress Administration. This was one of the employment programs of the President Franklin D. Roosevelt administration during the Great Depression, which invested in infrastructure of the country. 

Simply styled, the courthouse has "decorative corbeled courses, arched window opening with drip courses, [and a] triple arched entry porch." with four sets of double columns. In 1965 it was remodeled and expanded with one-story utilitarian additions. 

In 1989, the Gilchrist County Courthouse was listed in A Guide to Florida's Historic Architecture, published by the University of Florida Press.

References

External links

 Florida's Historic Courthouses

Buildings and structures in Gilchrist County, Florida
Gilchrist
Works Progress Administration in Florida
Government buildings completed in 1933
Government buildings completed in 1965